The 1993 Kerry Senior Football Championship was the 93rd staging of the Kerry Senior Football Championship since its establishment by the Kerry County Board in 1889. The championship ran from 25 June to 26 September 1993.

Mid Kerry entered the championship as the defending champions, however, they were beaten by Annascaul in the second round. Annascaul made their return to the championship after a 100-year absence.

The final was played on 26 September 1993 at Austin Stack Park in Tralee, between Laune Rangers and Annascaul, in what was their first ever meeting in the final. Laune Rangers won the match by 1-15 to 1-08 to claim their eighth championship title overall and a first title in four years.

Maurice O'Carroll was the championship's top scorer with 1-19.

Results

Round 1

Round 2

Quarter-finals

Semi-finals

Final

Championship statistics

Top scorers

Overall

In a single game

Miscellaneous

 Annascaul made their first appearance at senior level since 1893.
 Annascaul qualified for the final for the first time.

References

Kerry Senior Football Championship
1993 in Gaelic football